The French bicycle industry and the history of the bicycle are intertwined. Spanning the last century and a half, the industry has seen two booms, and continues into the 21st century, albeit less dominant today.

Invention

To most the invention of the bicycle was by the German Baron Karl von Drais, who rode his 1816 machine while collecting taxes from his tenants. He patented his "draisine" (or "draisienne"), a "pushbike" powered by the action of the rider's feet pushing against the ground.

Reports of early forebears of the bicycle were velocipedes, and included many human-powered vehicles. One, the scooter-like dandy horse or celerifere of the French Comte de Sivrac, dating to 1790, was long cited as the earliest bicycle, however, most historians now believe these unsteerable hobby-horses probably never existed, but were made up by Louis Baudry de Saunier, a 19th-century French bicycle historian.

Commercialization
In the 1860s, the Michaux family, Parisian coach builders, developed a new drive mechanism, placing pedals and cranks on an enlarged wooden front wheel with iron tires, which was mounted on a heavy steel frame. The credit for their innovative crank and pedals remains in dispute. Pierre Lallement, a Michaux mechanic, claimed to have collaborated with Ernest Michaux, while Henry Michaux told in March 1893 in the newspaper L'Éclair how his brother Ernest, together with their father Pierre have developed the idea in 1861 after modifying a draisine brought for repairs. The design was an adaptation of the crank-handles the two inventors had seen on a grinding wheel. In any event, Pierre Michaux's factory started producing crank-and-pedal driven velocipedes : two the first year, 142 the following year.

Perhaps owing to dispute over the invention, in 1865 Lallement emigrated to The United States, where, with the financial backing of James Carroll of Ansonia, Connecticut, he recorded the first U.S. patent on a bicycle, in 1866. Meanwhile, by 1865, the Michaux family was manufacturing 400 velocipedes annually; their bicycles were on display at the first international bicycle exhibition in 1867, and by 1869, the Michaux factory, with a daily production of 200, began selling in the United States. Their wood and iron construction earned these velocipedes the sobriquet Boneshakers. The first boneshaker race was in 1868, in Paris' Parc de Saint Cloud; the winner was James Moore, a friend of the Michaux family. Moore also won the 123 km Paris–Rouen race in 1869, finishing in 10 hours and 40 minutes.

However, tensions between France and Prussia building since the Austro-Prussian War of 1866 erupted into the Franco-Prussian War in 1870, and production of bicycles at Michaux was suspended to support the war effort. As a result, the next innovations occurred in Great Britain. Prior to the Franco-Prussian war, the Michaux family had reached an agreement with Rowley B. Turner of the Coventry Sewing Machine Company to manufacture 400 Michaux velocipedes to be sold in France. With the war, Turner arranged instead to sell them in England. James Starley, a foreman at Coventry, began to make improvements and in 1885, the Starley Rover, a safety bicycle manufactured by Starley's nephew, John Kemp Starley, was the first recognisably modern bicycle.

Golden age
While the bicycle was popular among wealthy young men in cities such as London, New York City, and Paris, Starley's safety bicycle ushered in the "golden age of bicycles." A bicycle craze swept Europe and North America during the Gay Nineties; suddenly, the bicycle was safe, affordable, and available for transport and leisure for the ordinary person. Although France was swept up in the craze, production remained centered in England and the United States. However, the seeds were sown for the rebirth of the French industry.

In 1881, Paul de Vivie, a man of twenty-eight, bought his first bicycle, an ordinary. By 1887, de Vivie decided to devote his attention to his avocation; he sold his business, and moved to Saint-Étienne, where he opened a bicycle shop and started a magazine, Le Cycliste. Velocio, as de Vivie was known, began to import bicycles from Coventry; within two years, however, he had begun to produce his own bicycles. His 1889 La Gauloise was the first bicycle produced in France.

French bicycle manufacturers
French bicycle manufacturers have included:

 Alcyon, established in 1902, ceased manufacture in 1928.
 Alleluia 
 Alex Singer
 Arcade
 Astra
 Automoto
 Louison Bobet, manufactured during the 1960s and 1970s.
 Caminade
 Chas Garin
 CNC 
 Cycleurope
 Cycles Aluminium begins manufacturing aluminum-framed bicycles in 1890.
 Cycles Bertin
 Cyfac, a contemporary French bicycle manufacturer.
 Cyrille Guimard
 Deveau (1900-1910)
 Decathlon, French sporting goods chain, design and made by the biggest manufacture in UE, Polish Kross.
 Aug.Deprez (1892-1898)
 Dilecta
 Douze Cycles, cargo bike manufacturer.
 Cycles Follis, established in 1903; went out of business in the summer of 2007.
 La Fontan
 R. Géminiani
 GIRS, established in 1997, with a focus on high-end road and time trial bikes.
 Gitane, established in 1930, continues to manufacture bicycles today.
 Gnôme Rhône
 Helyett
 René Herse, manufactured hand-built bicycles from the 1940s until the mid-1970s.
 Hurtu
 LeJeune
 Jeunet
 Lapebie
 LaPerle
 Lapierre
  , established in 1918, ceased manufacture in 1996.
 Meral
 Cycles Mercier
 Motobécane, established in 1923, filed for bankruptcy in 1981, ceased manufacturing bicycles after 1984.
 Michaux, manufactured velocipedes from 1861 until 1870.
 Origine Cycles, based in Arveyres, online sales of high-end road bikes.
 Peugeot, first manufactured bicycles in 1882; bicycles manufactured by and sold under the Cycleurope name since the late 1980s.
 Cycles Philippe, first manufactured bicycles in the 1970s
 Renault
 Roger Rivière
 Rochet
 Routens
 S1NEO
 Sauvage-Lejeune
 Skyde
 Starnord / France-Sport / Nord-Star
 Stella
 Sunn, established in 1988.
 Sutter
 Terrot
 Time Sport, a high-end road bike manufacturer, which was part of the Rossignol group
 Transfil
 Urago, ceased manufacture in the 1980s.
 VéloSoleX
 Vitus (bicycles)

French bicycle component manufacturers
French bicycle component manufacturers have included:

 AGDA
 Atom
 AVA
 Christophe
 CLB
 Corima
 Cyclo France
 Huret
 Hutchinson, founded in 1853.
 Idéale
 Lapize
 Look, established in 1951, began manufacturing clipless bicycle pedals in the 1980s.
 Lyotard
 Maillard
 Mafac, high quality manufacturer of brakes, racks, and tool kits until the 1980s.
 Mavic
 Maxicar
 Michelin, manufacturer of bicycle tires since the company was established in 1889.
 Milremo
 Nervar
 Nervex
 Normandy
 Simplex
 Stronglight
 Super Champion, manufacturer of high quality alloy rims until the 1980s.
 TA (Traction Avant)
 Time
 Transfil
 Zéfal

See also

 Bicycle
 Kogswell Porteur/Randonneur, a modern interpretation of classic French design
 List of road bicycle racing events

External links
 Classic Rendezvous: French Bicycles
 Ebykr: French Bicycle and Component Manufacturers
 French Bicycles by Sheldon Brown
 Overview of current French bicycle manufacturers (in French) 

Economic history of France
Cycling in France